Incarnation Children's Center (ICC) is a nursing facility for children living with HIV in New York City. From 1989 until 2000 the center operated as a foster care boarding home; since then it has concentrated on providing medical care. The ICC is a non-profit corporation affiliated with the Archdiocese of New York and Columbia University. From the late 1980s through 2005, foster children at the Center with HIV/AIDS were enrolled on clinical trials of antiretroviral medication, which was successful in reducing the death rate from AIDS. In 2005, the Center was the focus of "Guinea Pig Kids", a BBC documentary alleging ethical violations in these clinical trials. The allegations prompted an investigation by the Vera Institute of Justice, which concluded that no children had died as a result of the trials, but that the Center had kept poor records and sometimes failed to follow its own enrollment policies. Subsequently, the BBC apologized for "very serious issues" in "Guinea Pig Kids", and conceded that the documentary made misleading allegations and was biased toward the views of AIDS denialists.

References

External links
 Incarnation Children's Center website

Children's charities based in the United States
Charities based in New York City
HIV/AIDS organizations in the United States